
The Arsenal VB 10 was a French fighter-interceptor aircraft developed during and shortly after World War II. It was a low-wing monoplane with retractable tailwheel undercarriage and of largely orthodox configuration. The ultimate product of a design that began with the Arsenal VG 10 prior to the war, the VB 10 added a second engine behind the cockpit which drove a second propeller, coaxial with and contra-rotating to the propeller driven by the engine in the nose.

In January 1937 Arsenal were given a contract to develop a twin-engined heavy interceptor built from wood, powered by two 590 hp Hispano-Suiza 12X engines mounted in tandem inside the fuselage, driving co-axial propellers in the nose. Work on the VG 10 was abandoned in June 1937 in favour of the VG 20, which was essentially similar but powered by two 900 hp Hispano-Suiza 12Y engines. The VG 20 was abandoned in turn in January 1938, but the design work and studies were used for the design of the all-metal VB 10. For research in the development of the VG 10 and VG 20, Arsenal designed and built the VG 30 powered by a single 690 hp Hispano-Suiza 12X engine, which in turn led to the high-performance fighter prototypes of the VG 30 series.

Although the aircraft was first designed (and indeed ordered) in 1940, little progress was made during France's occupation, and the prototype did not fly until after VE day. By then, it was already apparent that the future of the fighter lay with jet power, but development of the VB 10 continued as a safety net for France's nascent jet fighter programmes. In December 1945, a contract for 200 machines was placed by the French government, the first of which flew on 3 November 1947. By the time the fourth had been delivered in September 1948, the entire order was cancelled, with the French Air Force relying on surplus British and American fighters to tide it over until domestically produced jet fighters appeared shortly thereafter.

Specifications (production version)

See also

References

Bibliography

External links

VB10
World War II French fighter aircraft
1940s French fighter aircraft
Twin-engined single-prop tractor aircraft
Aircraft with contra-rotating propellers
Cancelled military aircraft projects of France
Low-wing aircraft
Aircraft first flown in 1945